Jarek Kasar (also known by his stage name Chalice; born 3 April 1983) is an Estonian singer. He started his music career as a rapper.

Discography
Ühendatud inimesed (2003)
Süsteemsüsteem (2005)
Taevas ja perse (2007)
Supervõimed (2008)
Lärmakas naabrimees (2012)
Liiga palju viiuleid (2014)

References

External links

1983 births
Living people
21st-century Estonian male singers
Estonian rappers
Musicians from Tartu
Eesti Laul contestants